Nicholas I ( – ) was Emperor of Russia, King of Congress Poland and Grand Duke of Finland. He was the third son of Paul I and younger brother of his predecessor, Alexander I. Nicholas's reign began with the failed Decembrist revolt. He is mainly remembered in history as a reactionary whose controversial reign was marked by geographical expansion, centralisation of administrative policies and repression of dissent. Nicholas had a happy marriage that produced a large family; all of their seven children survived childhood.

Nicholas's biographer Nicholas V. Riasanovsky said that he displayed determination, singleness of purpose, and an iron will, along with a powerful sense of duty and a dedication to very hard work. He saw himself as a soldier—a junior officer totally consumed by spit and polish. A handsome man, he was highly nervous and aggressive. Trained as a military engineer, he was a stickler for minute detail. In his public persona, stated Riasanovsky, "Nicholas I came to represent autocracy personified: infinitely majestic, determined and powerful, hard as stone, and relentless as fate."

Nicholas I was instrumental in helping to create an independent Greek state, and resumed the Russian conquest of the Caucasus by seizing Iğdır Province and the remainder of modern-day Armenia and Azerbaijan from Qajar Persia during the Russo-Persian War of 1826–1828. He ended the Russo-Turkish War (1828–29) successfully as well. Later on, however, he led Russia into the Crimean War (1853–1856), with disastrous results. Historians emphasize that his micromanagement of the armies hindered his generals, as did his misguided strategy. William C. Fuller notes that historians have frequently concluded that "the reign of Nicholas I was a catastrophic failure in both domestic and foreign policy." On the eve of his death, the Russian Empire reached its geographical zenith, spanning over 20 million square kilometers ( million square miles), but had a desperate need for reform.

Early life and road to power

Nicholas was born at Gatchina Palace in Gatchina, the ninth child of Grand Duke Paul, heir to the Russian throne, and Grand Duchess Maria Feodorovna of Russia (née Sophie Dorothea of Württemberg). He had six older sisters and two older brothers, namely the future Emperor Alexander I of Russia and Grand Duke Constantine Pavlovich of Russia. 

Five months after Nicholas's birth, his grandmother, Catherine the Great, died and his parents became Emperor and Empress of Russia. In 1800, at the age of four years, Nicholas was named Grand Prior of Russia and entitled to wear the Maltese cross. Nicholas grew up to be a fine young man. Riasanovsky says of him that he is "the most handsome man in Europe, but also a charmer who enjoyed feminine company and was often at his best with the men."

On 13 July 1817, Nicholas married Princess Charlotte of Prussia (1798–1860), who took the name Alexandra Feodorovna when she converted to Orthodoxy. Charlotte's parents were Frederick William III of Prussia and Louise of Mecklenburg-Strelitz. Nicholas and Charlotte were third cousins, as they were both great-great-grandchildren of Frederick William I of Prussia.

With two older brothers, it initially seemed unlikely Nicholas would ever become Tsar. By and by, as Alexander and Constantine both failed to produce legitimate sons, Nicholas first came to attention as being likely to rule one day, or at least that his children may succeed. In 1825, when Alexander I died suddenly of typhus, Nicholas was caught between swearing allegiance to Constantine and accepting the throne for himself. The interregnum lasted until Constantine, who was in Warsaw at that time, confirmed his refusal. Additionally, on 25 (13 Old Style) December, Nicholas issued the manifesto proclaiming his accession to the throne. That manifesto retroactively named 1 December (19 November Old Style), the date of Alexander I's death, as the beginning of his reign. During this confusion, a plot was hatched by some members of the military to overthrow Nicholas and seize power. This led to the Decembrist Revolt on 26 (14 Old Style) December 1825, an uprising Nicholas was successful in quickly suppressing.

Emperor and principles

Early reign
Nicholas completely lacked his brother's spiritual and intellectual breadth; he saw his role simply as that of a paternal autocrat ruling his people by whatever means necessary. Nicholas I began his reign on 14 December 1825 (old style), which fell on a Monday; Russian superstition held that Mondays were unlucky days. This particular Monday dawned very cold, with temperatures of −8 degrees Celsius. This was regarded by the Russian people as a bad omen for the coming reign. The accession of Nicholas I was marred by a demonstration of 3000 young Imperial Army officers and other liberal-minded citizens. This demonstration was an attempt to force the government to accept a constitution and a representative form of government. Nicholas ordered the army out to smash the demonstration. The "uprising" was quickly put down and became known as the Decembrist Revolt. Having experienced the trauma of the Decembrist Revolt on the very first day of his reign, Nicholas I was determined to restrain Russian society. The Third Section of the Imperial Chancellery ran a huge network of spies and informers with the help of Gendarmes. The government exercised censorship and other forms of control over education, publishing, and all manifestations of public life. He appointed Alexander Benckendorff to head this Chancellery. Benckendorff employed 300 gendarmes and 16 staff in his office. He began collecting informers and intercepting mail at a high rate. Soon, because of Benckendorff, the saying that it was impossible to sneeze in one's house before it is reported to the emperor, became Benckendorff's creed.

Local policies

Tsar Nicholas abolished several areas of local autonomy. Bessarabia's autonomy was removed in 1828, Poland's in 1830 and the Jewish Qahal was abolished in 1843. As an exception to this trend, Finland was able to keep its autonomy partly due to Finnish soldiers' loyal participation in crushing the November Uprising in Poland.

Russia's first railway was open in 1837, a  line between St. Petersburg and the suburban residence of Tsarskoye Selo. The second was the Saint Petersburg – Moscow Railway, built in 1842–51. Nevertheless, by 1855 there were only  of Russian railways.

In 1833, Sergey Uvarov, of the Ministry of National Education, devised a program of "Orthodoxy, Autocracy and Nationality" as the guiding principle of the regime. It was a reactionary policy based on orthodoxy in religion, autocracy in government, and the state-founding role on the Russian nationality and equal citizen rights for all other peoples inhabiting Russia, with exclusion of Jews. The people were to show loyalty to the unrestricted authority of the tsar, to the traditions of the Russian Orthodox Church, and to the Russian language. These romantic and conservative principles outlined by Uvarov were also espoused by Vasily Zhukovsky, one of the tutors of the Grand Duke Alexander. The results of these Slavophile principles led, broadly speaking, to increasing repression of all classes, excessive censorship, and surveillance of independent minded intellectuals like Pushkin and Lermontov and to the persecution of non-Russian languages and non-Orthodox religions. Taras Shevchenko, later to become known as the national poet of Ukraine, was exiled to Siberia by a direct order of Tsar Nicholas after composing a poem that mocked the Tsar, his wife, and his domestic policies. By order of the Tsar, Shevchenko was kept under strict surveillance and prevented from writing or painting.

From 1839, Tsar Nicholas also used a former Byzantine Catholic priest named Joseph Semashko as his agent to force Orthodoxy upon the Eastern Rite Catholics of Ukraine, Belarus, and Lithuania. This caused Tsar Nicholas to be condemned by a succession of Roman Pontiffs, the Marquis de Custine, Charles Dickens, and many Western governments. See also Cantonists.

Nicholas disliked serfdom and toyed with the idea of abolishing it in Russia, but declined to do so for reasons of state. He feared the aristocracy and believed they might turn against him if he abolished serfdom. However, he did make some efforts to improve the lot of the Crown Serfs (serfs owned by the government) with the help of his minister Pavel Kiselyov. During most of his reign he tried to increase his control over the landowners and other influential groups in Russia. In 1831, Nicholas restricted the votes in the Noble Assembly to those with over 100 serfs, leaving 21,916 voters. In 1841, landless nobles were banned from selling serfs separate from the land. From 1845, attainment of the 5th highest rank (out of 14) in the Table of Ranks was required to be ennobled, previously it had been the 8th rank.

King of Poland 
Nicholas was crowned King of Poland in Warsaw on 12 (24) May 1829, in accordance with the Polish Constitution, a document he would not respect thereafter. He is the only Russian monarch ever crowned King of Polandalthough not the only one bestowed with the title.

Culture
The official emphasis on Russian nationalism fueled a debate on Russia's place in the world, the meaning of Russian history, and the future of Russia. One group, the westernizers, believed that Russia remained backward and primitive and could progress only through more Europeanization. Another group, the Slavophiles, enthusiastically favored the Slavs and their culture and customs, and had a distaste for westerners and their culture and customs.

The Slavophiles viewed Slavic philosophy as a source of wholeness in Russia and were sceptical of Western rationalism and materialism. Some of them believed that the Russian peasant commune, or Mir, offered an attractive alternative to Western capitalism and could make Russia a potential social and moral savior, thus representing a form of Russian messianism. However the ministry of education had a policy of closing philosophy faculties because of possible harmful effects.

In the wake of the Decembrist revolt, the tsar moved to protect the status quo by centralizing the educational system. He wanted to neutralize the threat of foreign ideas and what he ridiculed as "pseudo-knowledge." However, his minister of education, Sergei Uvarov, quietly promoted academic freedom and autonomy, raised academic standards, improved facilities, and opened higher education to the middle classes. By 1848 the tsar, fearing the political upheavals in the West might inspire similar uprisings in Russia, ended Uvarov's innovations. The universities were small and closely monitored, especially the potentially dangerous philosophy departments. Their main mission was to train a loyal, athletic, masculinized senior bureaucracy that avoided the effeminacy of office work.

The Imperial Academy of Fine Arts in St. Petersburg grew in importance by its recognition and support of artists. Nicholas I decided to control it personally. He overruled it regarding awarding ranks to artists. He reprimanded and humiliated artists whose works he found distasteful. The result was not better art, but just the reverse, compounded by fear and insecurity among members of the art community.

Despite the repressions of this period, Russians outside official control produced a flowering of literature and the arts. Through the works of Aleksandr Pushkin, Nikolai Gogol, Ivan Turgenev and numerous others, Russian literature gained international stature and recognition. Ballet took root in Russia after its importation from France, and classical music became firmly established with the compositions of Mikhail Glinka (1804–1857).

Minister of Finance Georg von Cancrin persuaded the emperor of the benefits of inviting Prussian scientist Alexander von Humboldt to Russia to investigate regions that could produce mineral wealth. The Russian government paid Humboldt's expenses for his eight-month expedition through Russia in 1829, which resulted in diamond finds in the Ural mountains. Humboldt published multiple volumes on his Russian expedition, which he dedicated to the tsar despite his increasing disapproval of the tsar's policies.

Treatment of Jews 
In 1851 the Jewish population numbered at 2.4 million with 212,000 of them living in Russian controlled Poland territory. This made them one of the largest inorodtsy minorities in the Russian Empire.

On 26 August 1827 the edict of military conscription ("Ustav rekrutskoi povinnosti") was introduced, which required Jewish boys to serve in the Russian military for 25 years from the age of 18. Before that many of them were forcibly conscripted into Cantonist schools since the age of 12, while being a Cantonist did not count into the time of military service. They were sent far away from their families to serve in the military so they would have difficulties practising Judaism and thus be Russified. The poorer village Jews, Jews without families and unmarried Jews were especially targeted for military service. Between 1827 and 1854 it is estimated that there were 70,000 Jews conscripted. Some of the Jews who were forcibly conscripted into the Russian military were, in the absence of connection to their families or community, compelled to convert to Christianity.

Under Nicholas I, the Jewish agricultural colonisation of Ukraine continued with the transfer of Siberian Jews to Ukraine. In Ukraine, Jews were given land, but had to pay for it, which left very little to support their families. On the other hand, these Jews were exempt from forced military conscription.

Under Nicholas I there were attempts to reform the education of Jews with the object of Russification. Study of the Talmud was disapproved of as it was seen as a text that encouraged Jewish segregation from Russian society. Nicholas I further toughened censorship of Jewish books in Yiddish and Hebrew by allowing these to be printed only in Zhitomir and Vilna.

Military and foreign policy

Nicolas' aggressive foreign policy involved many expensive wars, having a disastrous effect on the empire's finances. Nicholas lavished attention on his very large army; of a population of 60–70 million people, the army counted one million men. They had outdated equipment and tactics, but the tsar, who dressed like a soldier and surrounded himself with officers, gloried in the victory over Napoleon in 1812 and took enormous pride in its smartness on parade. The cavalry horses, for example, were only trained in parade formations, and did poorly in battle. The glitter and braid masked profound weaknesses that he did not see. He put generals in charge of most of his civilian agencies regardless of their qualifications. An agnostic who won fame in cavalry charges was made supervisor of Church affairs. The Army became the vehicle of upward social mobility for noble youths from non-Russian areas, such as Poland, the Baltic, Finland, and Georgia. On the other hand, many miscreants, petty criminals, and undesirables were punished by local officials by being enlisted for life in the Army. The conscription system was highly unpopular with people, as was the practice of forcing peasants to house the soldiers for six months of the year. Curtiss finds that "The pedantry of Nicholas's military system, which stressed unthinking obedience and parade ground evolutions rather than combat training, produced ineffective commanders in time of war." His commanders in the Crimean War were old and incompetent, and indeed so were his muskets as the colonels sold the best equipment and the best food.

For much of Nicholas' reign, Russia was seen as a major military power, with considerable strength. The Crimean war, fought shortly before Nicholas' death, demonstrated to both Russia and the world what few had previously realized: Russia was militarily weak, technologically backward, and administratively incompetent. Despite his grand ambitions toward the south and Turkey, Russia had not built railroad network in that direction, and communications were bad. The bureaucracy was unprepared for war being riddled with graft, corruption, and inefficiency. The Navy had few competent officers, the rank and file were poorly trained and most importantly of its vessels were outdated; the Army, although very large, was good only for parades, suffered from colonels who pocketed their men's pay, poor morale, and was even more out of touch with the latest technology as developed by Britain and France. By the war's end, Russia's leaders were determined to reform their military and society. As Fuller notes, "Russia had been beaten on the Crimean peninsula, and the military feared that it would inevitably be beaten again unless steps were taken to surmount its military weakness."

An intensely militaristic man, Nicholas regarded the Army as the best and greatest institution in Russia and as a model for society, saying:

Nicholas was often exasperated by the slow pace of the Russian bureaucracy and had a marked preference for appointing generals and admirals to high government rank because of their perceived efficiency, overlooking or ignoring whether or not they were actually qualified for the role. Of the men who served as Nicholas's ministers, 61% had previously served as a general or an admiral. Nicholas liked to appoint generals who had seen combat, and at least 30 of the men who served as a minister under him had seen action in the wars against France, the Ottoman Empire, and Sweden. This proved to be something of a handicap in the sense that the sort of qualities that could make a man distinguished on the battlefields such as bravery did not necessarily make a man capable of running a ministry. The most notorious case was Prince Alexander Sergeyevich Menshikov, a competent brigade commander in the Imperial Army who proved himself out of his depth as a Navy minister. Of the Emperor's ministers, 78% were ethnic Russians, 9.6% were Baltic Germans while the rest were foreigners in Russian service. Of the men who served as ministers under Nicholas, 14 had graduated from university while another 14 had graduated from a lycée or a gymnasium, the rest had all been educated by private tutors.

Europe 

In foreign policy, Nicholas I acted as the protector of ruling legitimism and as guardian against revolution. It has often been noted that such policies were linked with the Metternich counter-revolutionary system through the Austrian ambassador Count Karl Ludwig von Ficquelmont. Nicholas's offers to suppress revolution on the European continent, trying to follow the pattern set by his eldest brother, Alexander I, earned him the label of "gendarme of Europe".

Immediately on his succession Nicholas began to limit the liberties that existed under the constitutional monarchy in Congress Poland. Nicholas was outraged when he learned of the Belgian revolt against the Dutch in 1830 and ordered the Russian Army to mobilize. Nicholas then petitioned the Prussian ambassador for Russian troops to be granted transit rights in order to march across Europe and restore Dutch hegemony over Belgium. But at the same time, a cholera epidemic was decimating the Russian Army and the revolt in Poland tied down Russian soldiers which might have been deployed against the Belgians. It seems likely that Nicholas's hawkish stance was not a sincere prelude towards invasion of the Low Countries, but rather an attempt to apply pressure on the other European powers. Nicholas made it clear he would only act if Prussia and Britain also participated as he feared that a Russian invasion of Belgium would cause a war with France. Even before the Poles rose up, Nicholas had cancelled his plans for invading Belgium as it became clear that neither Britain nor Prussia would join in while the French openly threatened war if Nicholas should march. In 1815, Nicholas arrived in France, where he stayed with the duc d'Orleans, who soon become one of his best friends, with the grand duke being impressed with duc's personal warmth, intelligence, manners and grace. For Nicholas the worst sort of characters were nobility who supported liberalism, and when the duc d'Orleans become the king of the French as Louis Philippe I in the July revolution of 1830, Nicholas took this as a personal betrayal, believing his friend had gone over as he saw it to the dark side of revolution and liberalism. Nicholas hated Louis-Philippe, the self-styled Le roi citoyen ("the Citizen King") as a renegade nobleman and an "usurper,” and his foreign policy starting in 1830 was primarily anti-French, based upon reviving the coalition that had existed during the Napoleonic Era of Russia, Prussia, Austria and Britain, to isolate France. Nicholas detested Louis-Philippe to the point that he refused to use his name, referring to him merely as "the usurper". Britain was unwilling to join the anti-French coalition, but Nicholas was successful in cementing existing close ties with Austria and Prussia and the three imperial states regularly held joint military reviews during this time. For much of the 1830s, a sort of "cold war" existed between the liberal "western bloc" of France and Britain vs. the reactionary "eastern bloc" of Austria, Prussia and Russia.

After the November Uprising broke out, in 1831 the Polish parliament deposed Nicholas as king of Poland in response to his repeated curtailment of its constitutional rights. Nicholas reacted by sending Russian troops into Poland and brutally crushed the rebellion. Nicholas then proceeded to abrogate the Polish constitution in virtual entirety and reduced Poland to the status of a province called Vistula Land. Soon after, Nicholas embarked on a policy of repressing Polish culture beginning with suppressing the Polish Catholic Church. In the 1840s, Nicholas reduced 64,000 Polish nobles to commoner status.

In 1848, when a series of revolutions convulsed Europe, Nicholas was at the forefront of reactionism. In 1849, he helped the Habsburgs to suppress the revolution in Hungary, and he also urged Prussia not to adopt a liberal constitution.

Ottoman Empire and Persia 

While Nicholas was attempting to maintain the status quo in Europe, he followed a somewhat more aggressive policy toward the neighboring empires to the south, the Ottoman Empire and Persia. Nicholas was widely believed at the time to be following the traditional Russian policy of resolving the so-called Eastern Question by seeking to partition the Ottoman Empire and establish a protectorate over the Orthodox population of the Balkans, still largely under Ottoman control in the 1820s. In fact, Nicholas was deeply committed to upholding the status quo in Europe and feared any attempt to devour the decaying Ottoman Empire would both upset his ally Austria, which also had interests in the Balkans, and bring about an Anglo-French coalition in defense of the Ottomans. Furthermore, in the war of 1828–29, the Russians defeated the Ottomans in every battle fought in the field and advanced deep into the Balkans, but the Russians discovered that they lacked the necessary logistical strength to take Constantinople.

Nicholas' policy towards the Ottoman Empire was to use the 1774 Treaty of Küçük Kaynarca which gave Russia a vague right as protector of Orthodox peoples in the Balkans, as a way of placing the Ottoman Empire into the Russian sphere of influence, which was felt to be a more achievable goal than conquering the entire Ottoman Empire. Nicholas actually wanted to preserve the Ottoman Empire as a stable but weak state that would be unable to stand up to Russia, which was felt to serve Russia's interests. Nicholas always thought of Russia as first and foremost a European power and regarded Europe as more important than the Middle East. The Russian Foreign Minister Karl Nesselrode wrote in letter to his ambassador in Constantinople Nikolai Muravyov that the victory of Muhammad Ali of Egypt over Mahmud II would lead to a new dynasty ruling the Ottoman Empire. Nesselrode continued that if the able Muhammad Ali became sultan then it "could, with the elevation of a new personage to the Turkish throne, revive new strength in that declining empire and distract our attention and forces from European affairs, and thus the monarch [Nicholas] is especially concerned to keep the sultan on his tottering throne." At the same time, Nicholas argued that because of the economic importance to Russia of the Turkish straits, through which Russia exports its grain, that Russia had the "right" to intervene in Ottoman affairs. In 1833, Nicholas told the Austrian ambassador Karl Ludwig von Ficquelmont that "Oriental affairs are above all a matter for Russia." At the same time that Nicholas claimed the Ottoman Empire was within the Russian sphere of influence, he made it clear that he had no interest in annexing the empire. At another meeting with Ficquelmont in 1833, Nicholas, speaking with the "Greek Project" of Catherine the Great in mind said: "I know everything that has been said of the projects of the Empress Catherine, and Russia has renounced the goal she had set out. I wish to maintain the Turkish empire... It if falls, I do not desire its debris. I need nothing." Ultimately, Nicholas's policies in the Near East proved to be both costly and largely futile.

In 1826–28, Nicholas fought the Russo-Persian War (1826–28), which ended with Persia forced to cede its last remaining territories in the Caucasus. Russia had conquered all the territories of Iran in both the North Caucasus and South Caucasus, comprising modern-day Georgia, Dagestan, Armenia, and Azerbaijan, through the course of the 19th century. The treaty further conceded extraterritoriality to Russian subjects in Iran (capitulation). As Professor Virginia Aksan adds, the 1828 Treaty of Turkmenchay "removed Iran from the military equation."

Russia fought a successful war against the Ottomans in 1828–29, but it did little to increase Russian power in Europe. Only a small Greek state became independent in the Balkans, with limited Russian influence. In 1833, Russia negotiated the Treaty of Unkiar-Skelessi with the Ottoman Empire. The major European parties mistakenly believed that the treaty contained a secret clause granting Russia the right to transit warships through the Bosphorus and Dardanelles straits. This misconception led to the London Straits Convention of 1841, which affirmed Ottoman control over the straits and forbade any power, including Russia, from sending warships through them. Buoyed by his role in suppressing the revolutions of 1848 as well as his mistaken belief he could rely on British diplomatic support, Nicholas moved against the Ottomans, who declared war on Russia on 8 October 1853. On 30 November, Russian Admiral Nakhimov caught the Turkish fleet in the harbor at Sinope and destroyed it.

Fearing the results of a total Ottoman defeat by Russia, in 1854 Britain, France, the Kingdom of Sardinia formed a military coalition and joined forces with the Ottoman Empire against Russia. The preceding conflict became known as the Crimean War in the Ottoman Empire and Western Europe, but was labelled in Russia the "Eastern War" (Russian: Восточная война, Vostochnaya Vojna). In April 1854, Austria signed a defensive pact with Prussia. Thus, Russia found herself in a war with every Great Power of Europe either allied against her militarily or diplomatically.

In 1853 Mikhail Pogodin, professor of history at Moscow University, wrote a memorandum to Nicholas. Nicholas himself read Pogodin's text and approvingly commented: "That is the whole point." According to historian Orlando Figes, "The memorandum clearly struck a chord with Nicholas, who shared Pogodin’s sense that Russia’s role as the protector of the Orthodox had not been recognized or understood and that Russia was unfairly treated by the West." Pogodin wrote:

Austria offered the Ottomans diplomatic support, and Prussia remained neutral, thus leaving Russia without any allies on the continent. The European allies landed in Crimea and laid siege to the well-fortified Russian Sevastopol Naval Base. The Russians lost battles at Alma in September 1854 and then at Balaklava and Inkerman. After the prolonged Siege of Sevastopol (1854–55) the base fell, exposing Russia's inability to defend a major fortification on its own soil. On the death of Nicholas I, Alexander II became Tsar. On 15 January 1856, the new tsar took Russia out of the war on very unfavorable terms, which included the loss of a naval fleet on the Black Sea.

Death

Nicholas died on 2 March 1855, during the Crimean War, at the Winter Palace in St. Petersburg. He caught a chill, refused medical treatment and died of pneumonia, although there were rumors he was committing a passive suicide by refusing treatment. He was buried in the Peter and Paul Cathedral in St. Petersburg. He reigned for 30 years, and was succeeded by his son Alexander II.

Legacy

There have been many damning verdicts on Nicholas' rule and legacy. At the end of his life, one of his most devoted civil servants, A.V. Nikitenko, opined, "the main failing of the reign of Nicholas Pavlovich was that it was all a mistake."
In 1891 Lev Tolstoy popularised the nickname Николай Палкин (Nicholas the Stick) in reference to the military discipline associated with the late emperor.

However, from time to time, efforts are made to revive Nicholas's reputation. Historian Barbara Jelavich, on the other hand, points to many failures, including the "catastrophic state of Russian finances", the badly-equipped army, the inadequate transportation system, and a bureaucracy "which was characterized by graft, corruption, and inefficiency".

Kiev University was founded in 1834 by Nicholas. In 1854, there were 3600 university students in Russia, 1000 fewer than in 1848. Censorship was omnipresent; historian Hugh Seton-Watson writes: "the intellectual atmosphere remained oppressive until the end of the reign."

As a traveler in Spain, Italy and Russia, the Frenchman Marquis de Custine wrote in his widely-read book La Russie en 1839 (English translation: Empire of the Czar: A Journey Through Eternal Russia) that, inside, Nicholas was a good person, and behaved as he did only because he believed he had to: "If the Emperor has no more of mercy in his heart than he reveals in his policies, then I pity Russia; if, on the other hand, his true sentiments are really superior to his acts, then I pity the Emperor."

Nicholas figures in an urban legend about the Saint Petersburg–Moscow Railway. When the route was planned in 1842, he supposedly demanded the shortest path be used - despite major obstacles in the way. The story says he used a ruler to draw the straight line himself. This false story became popular both at home and abroad as an explanation of how badly Russia was governed. By the 1870s, Russians were telling a different version, claiming the tsar was wise to overcome local interests that wanted the railway diverted this way and that. What actually happened was that the road was laid out by engineers, and Nicholas endorsed their advice to build in a straight line.

Honours

Issue 
Nicholas I had seven legitimate children with his wife, Alexandra Feodorovna.

Many sources state that Nicholas did not have an extramarital affair until after 25 years of marriage, in 1842, when the Empress's doctors prohibited her from having sexual intercourse, due to her poor health and recurring heart attacks. Many facts dispute this claim. Nicholas fathered three known children with mistresses prior to 1842, including one with his most famous and well documented mistress, Varvara Nelidova.

With Anna-Maria Charlota de Rutenskiold (1791–1856)

Youzia Koberwein (12 May 1825 – 23 February 1923)

With Varvara Yakovleva (1803-1831)

Olga Carlovna Albrecht (10 July 1828 – 20 January 1898)

With Varvara Nelidova (d.1897)

Alexis Pashkine (17 April 1831 – 20 June 1863)

Ancestry

See also
 History of Russia
 Imperial Russia
 La Russie en 1839
 The Third Section
 Tsars of Russia family tree

Notes

References
 The first draft of this article was taken with little editing from the Library of Congress Federal Research Division's Country Studies series. As their home page at  http://lcweb2.loc.gov/frd/cs/cshome.html says, "Information contained in the Country Studies On-Line is not copyrighted and thus is available for free and unrestricted use by researchers. As a courtesy, however, appropriate credit should be given to the series." Please leave this statement intact so that credit can be given.

Further reading

 Bolsover, George H. "Nicholas I and the Partition of Turkey." Slavonic and East European Review (1948): 115-145 online.
 Cannady, Sean, and Paul Kubicek. "Nationalism and legitimation for authoritarianism: A comparison of Nicholas I and Vladimir Putin." Journal of Eurasian Studies 5.1 (2014): 1-9 online.
 Crisp, Olga. "The state peasants under Nicholas I." Slavonic and East European Review 37.89 (1959): 387-412 online.
 Curtiss, John Shelton. "The Army of Nicholas I: Its Role and Character." American Historical Review 63.4 (1958): 880-889 online.
 Hamlin, Cyrus. "The Political Duel Between Nicholas, the Czar of Russia, and Lord Stratford de Redcliffe, the Great English Ambassador." Proceedings of the American Antiquarian Society Vol. 9. (1893) online.
 Hosking, Geoffrey A. Russia: People and Empire, 1552-1917, (Harvard University Press, 1997)
 Kagan, Frederick W. The military reforms of Nicholas I (Palgrave Macmillan US, 1999).
 Kutscheroff, Samuel. "Administration of Justice under Nicholas I of Russia." American Slavic and East European Review (1948): 125–138. in JSTOR
 Lincoln, W. Bruce. "Nicholas I: Russia's Last Absolute Monarch," History Today (1971) 21 #2 pp.79–88.
 Lincoln, W. Bruce. Nicholas I: Emperor and Autocrat of All the Russias (1989) online
 Monas, Sidney. The Third Section: police and society in Russia under Nicholas I (Harvard University Press, 1961)
 Presni͡akov, A. E. Emperor Nicholas I of Russia: the apogee of autocracy, 1825/1855 (1974) online
 Pintner, Walter McKenzie. Russian economic policy under Nicholas I (1967) online
 Rendall, Matthew. "Restraint or Self-Restraint of Russia: Nicholas I, the Treaty of Unkiar Skelessi, and the Vienna System, 1832–1841." International History Review 24.1 (2002): 37–63.
 Riasanovsky, Nicholas V. "'Nationality' in the State Ideology during the Reign of Nicholas I." Russian Review (1960): 38-46 online.
 Riasanovsky, Nicholas V. Nicholas I and Official Nationality in Russia, 1825–1855 (1967) online
 Roberts, Ian W. Nicholas I and the Russian intervention in Hungary (Springer, 1991).
 Stanislawski, Michael. Tsar Nicholas I and the Jews : the transformation of Jewish society in Russia, 1825-1855 (1983) online

External links

 
  – Historical reconstruction "The Romanovs". StarMedia. Babich-Design(Russia, 2013)

|-

|-

 
1796 births
1855 deaths
19th-century Russian monarchs
19th-century Polish monarchs
Burials at Saints Peter and Paul Cathedral, Saint Petersburg
House of Holstein-Gottorp-Romanov
3
3
3
Grand Crosses of the Order of Saint Stephen of Hungary
Knights Grand Cross of the Military Order of William
Knights of the Golden Fleece of Spain
Extra Knights Companion of the Garter
Eastern Orthodox monarchs
People of the Revolutions of 1848
People of the Russo-Persian Wars
Rulers of Finland
Russian emperors
Russian grand dukes
Russian people of the Crimean War
18th-century people from the Russian Empire
Russification
Children of Paul I of Russia
People of the Caucasian War
Deaths from pneumonia in Russia
Sons of emperors